The Sloan Fellows program is the world's first mid-career and senior career master's degree in general management and leadership. It was initially supported by a grant from Alfred P. Sloan, the late CEO of General Motors, to his alma mater, MIT. The program was established in 1930 at the MIT Sloan School of Management. Later it was expanded to the Stanford Graduate School of Business (1957), and London Business School (1968). Considered to be one of the most prestigious management training programs in the world, it targets experienced leaders who have demonstrated success either within organizations, or independently as entrepreneurs. Notable alumni include Kofi Annan, former United Nations Secretary-General and Nobel Peace Prize Laureate (MIT, '72), John Browne, Baron Browne of Madingley, former chairman and CEO of BP and member of the British House of Lords (Stanford, '81), and Carly Fiorina, former CEO of Hewlett-Packard (MIT, '89).

History
The Sloan Fellows Program was created at the MIT Sloan School of Management in 1930, by Alfred P. Sloan, Chairman of General Motors from 1937 to 1956, who envisioned the Sloan Fellowship as a means of developing the "ideal manager".  The Sloan Fellows Program is the world's first general management and leadership education program for mid-career experienced managers.

In the following decades, the program was expanded to include the Sloan Master's at Stanford Graduate School of Business (1957) and the Sloan Master's at London Business School (1968). In 2013, Stanford changed the name of its Sloan Fellows Program to Stanford MSx (Master of Science in Management for Experienced Leaders), though participants in the program remain Stanford Sloan Fellows.

Academics
Sloan Fellows comprise a mix of company and self-sponsored candidates. At all three schools, a significant degree of experience is required for admission. Alumni describe the program as "transformational", in keeping with Alfred P. Sloan's original vision of preparing accomplished managers for senior business leadership positions and increasingly, launching successful enterprise ventures.

The Sloan Fellows program is delivered full-time over the course of 12–14 months, depending on electives. London Business School and MIT Sloan offer an optional research thesis.

The program recognizes the importance of developing leadership and management competency in Sloan Fellows. As such, in addition to the standard MBA curriculum of management courses, the Sloan program contains a strong personal development component designed to develop the leadership and strategic thinking capabilities of Sloan Fellows. The London Business School Sloan Master's is a specialized program emphasizing strategy, leadership and an intensive personal development provision.

Admission
Admission to the Sloan Fellow programs is highly selective. At the MIT Sloan School of Management, the prospective applicant needs to first register interest through the program website and upload a resume. After an initial screening, a member of the admissions committee will contact the registered applicant to schedule a 30 minute phone orientation. Prospective applicants are invited to visit the program in Cambridge, Massachusetts for class visits, to engage with current students and meet the program officers.

After the initial screening, applicants submit a formal application, which includes undergraduate transcripts, GMAT or GRE score report, letters of recommendation, and personal essays. The received applications are screened by the admissions committee, and selected applicants are invited for a formal admissions interview, usually held on campus, or via video conference for international students. Following the interview, admissions decisions are made and applicants are notified. This process is repeated three times for three rounds of application deadlines.

Traditional full-time MBA programs comparison

MIT, Stanford and LBS differences

Degrees
Sloan Fellows at MIT Sloan may opt for an MBA, Master of Science in Management, or Master of Science in Management of Technology. Sloan Fellows at London Business School and Stanford Graduate School of Business are awarded a Master of Science degree.

Prominent alumni
Notable Sloan Fellows of the MIT Sloan School of Management include:
F. Duane Ackerman (SF '78), former Chairman and CEO of BellSouth
Thad Allen, former Commandant of the U.S. Coast Guard
Kofi Annan (SF '72), former Secretary-General of the United Nations and winner of Nobel Peace Prize in 2001
Megan J. Brennan (SF'03), 74th United States Postmaster General, CEO of United States Postal Service
Patrick R. Donahoe (SF'93), 73rd United States Postmaster General, CEO of United States Postal Service
John E. Potter (SF'95), 72nd United States Postmaster General, CEO of United States Postal Service
Chan Chun Sing (SF '05), Minister in Prime Minister's Office and the Secretary-General of the National Trades Union Congress, Singapore
Colby Chandler, former Chairman and CEO of Kodak
Philip M. Condit (SF '75), former Chairman and CEO of Boeing
Carly Fiorina, former CEO of Hewlett-Packard
Roger W Hale ( SF ‘79), former Chairman and CEO of LG&E Energy Corp
John Legere, (SF '91) CEO of T-Mobile US
Donald V. Fites (SF '71), former Chairman and CEO of Caterpillar Inc
William Clay Ford, Jr. (SF '84), Chairman of Ford Motor Company
James C. Foster (SF '85), Chairman and CEO of Charles River Laboratories
Gan Siow Huang (SF '10), first Singaporean female general
Bruce S. Gordon (SF '88), former President and CEO of NAACP
Daniel Hesse, President and CEO of Sprint Nextel
Robert Horton (SF '71), British businessman and former Chairman and CEO of BP
Robert Lawrence Kuhn (SF '80), China expert, corporate strategist, and public intellectual
Nabiel Makarim (SF '85), former Minister of Environment of Indonesia
Alan Mulally (SF '82), former President and CEO of Ford Motor Company
Abdullatif bin Ahmed Al Othman (SF '98), Governor of Saudi Arabia's General Investment Authority (SAGIA)
William A. Porter, co-founder of E*TRADE
Gerhard Schulmeyer, former President and CEO of Siemens
Keiji Tachikawa (SF '78), President of the Japan Aerospace Exploration Agency
John W. Thompson (SF '83), Chairman of Symantec
Ron Williams (SF '84), CEO and Chairman of Aetna

Notable Stanford MSx (Sloan Fellows) alumni include:
William Amelio (MS '89), President and CEO, Lenovo Group (China)
Ian Brady (MS '11), Co-founder, SoFi (US)
Scott Brady (MS '00), founder and CEO, Fiber Tower and Slice (US)
Lord John Browne of Madingley (MS '81), Chairman and CEO of BP, Member of the British House of Lords (UK)
Mike Cagney (MS '11), Co-founder and CEO, SoFi (US)
Sir Howard Davies (MS '80), Director, London School of Economics, and Deputy Governor, Bank of England (UK)
Paul Deneve (MS '10), CEO, Yves Saint Laurent (France)
Thomas Falk (MS '89), Chairman, President and CEO, Kimberly-Clark (US)
Dr. Chris Gibson-Smith (MS '85), Chairman, London Stock Exchange (UK)
Alan Giles (MS '88), CEO, HMV (UK)
Noosheen Hashemi (MS '93), Founder and CEO, January.ai (US)
Brigadier General Lee Hsien Yang (MS '80), CEO, Singtel (Singapore)
Hon. Regina Ip (MS '87), Secretary for Security, Government of Hong Kong
Robert Joss (MS '66), CEO, Westpac Bank (Australia), and Dean, Stanford Graduate School of Business (US)
Dan Macklin (MS '11), Co-founder, SoFi (US)
Sir Deryck Maughan (MS '78), Managing Director and Chairman, KKR Asia, former CEO of Citigroup International (US)
Sir Callum McCarthy (MS '82), Chairman, Financial Services Authority (UK)
Hank McKinnell (MS '68), Chairman and CEO, Pfizer (US)
Gary Mekikian (MS), Co-founder and CEO, M&M Media Inc, (US)
JoAnn H. Morgan (MS '77), Senior Executive, NASA (US)
Daniel Novegil (MS '84), CEO, Ternium (Argentina)
John Robert Porter (MS '81), Chairman, Telos Group (Belgium)
Mark Pigott (MS '95), Chairman and CEO, Paccar (US)
Frank Shrontz (1970), Chairman, Boeing (US)
Karl Slym (MS), CEO, Tata Motors (UK)
Guram “Guga” Tsanava (MS '12), CEO, Georgian Outlets & Resort Group (Georgia)
Min Zhu (MS), Co-founder and President and Chief Technical Officer, WebEx (US)

Notable London Business School (Sloan Fellows) alumni include:
	Mary Curnock-Cook, OBE	SLN2002	Chief Executive Universities & Colleges Admissions Service
	Jitesh Gadhia	SLN2000	Senior Advisor, Blackstone Group

References

Further reading
 Wikipedia list of prominent Sloan Fellows
 MIT Sloan Fellows Program in Innovation & Global Leadership
 Stanford Sloan Master's Program
 Sloan Fellowship MSc at London Business School
 Interview with Stephen Sacca, MIT SF '90 and Director of the MIT Sloan Fellow Program, Aug 3rd 2010
 Blog about Stanford Sloan Fellows Program
 Facebook Page about the MIT SF Program
 Linkedin Sloan Fellows Group
 FT.com March 19, 2012 article on the Sloan Fellows Program: "A degree of choice for the older and wiser student"
 Nanyang Fellows
 Google+ Profile for MIT Sloan Fellows Program

 
Educational programs
Business schools in Massachusetts
Massachusetts Institute of Technology
London Business School
Stanford University
Alfred P. Sloan Foundation